Tapirira chimalapana is a species of plant in the family Anacardiaceae. It is endemic to the Uxpanapa-Chimalapa area of eastern Mexico, in the states of Oaxaca and Veracruz.

References

chimalapana
Endemic flora of Mexico
Trees of Oaxaca
Trees of Veracruz
Taxonomy articles created by Polbot